Cocktail is a 2010 Malayalam-language thriller film edited and directed by Arun Kumar Aravind. The film stars Jayasurya, Anoop Menon, and Samvrutha Sunil in the lead roles, while Fahadh Faasil, Aparna Nair, Innocent, and Mamukkoya play supporting roles. The film released on 22 October 2010.

The film was co-written by Anoop Menon and is an uncredited remake of the Canadian film Butterfly on a Wheel. It was the directorial debut of film editor Arun Kumar. The film was remade in Tamil as Athithi (2014).

Plot
Ravi Abraham is one of the key brains behind the success of a construction firm. He has rivals within and outside the office,  jealous of his success. At home, he has a blissful life with his wife Parvathy and daughter Ammu. One fine morning, things go terribly wrong for Ravi and Parvathy, with a stranger who asks for a lift in their car. For the first few minutes, the stranger appears to be a naive mild guy, but his tone changes soon, and he begins to blackmail the couple, telling them that their daughter is kidnapped and with just one phone call from him, the new babysitter will kill her.

Ravi and Parvathy are forced to obey several bizarre instructions one after the other. First, the stranger asks them to withdraw the entire balance from their bank account in cash. Soon after, the stranger sets fire to the currency notes in a suitcase and throws the suitcase into a river along with their wallets. He then proceeds to ask for more money, so Ravi sells his wristwatch. As the day progresses, both Ravi and Parvathy are made to drive around and perform tasks, including leaking Ravi's firm's top secret business plans to their rival group, forcing Ravi to bargain with a sex worker Elsa. The stranger also traps them in a sleazy lodge where he begins to remove Parvathy's garments but stops short of proceeding further. At last, towards the late hours of the night, they reach the house of Ravi's boss Naveen Krishnamurthy. Ravi is asked to shoot Naveen if he wants to have his daughter returned alive. Ravi enters the house, and to his surprise, finds his colleague Devi there.

Part of the drama is unveiled to the audience now: it is Devi's house, the stranger is her husband Venkatesh, and Ravi and Devi have been having an extramarital affair. In the subsequent few minutes, the audience realises that all of this was a drama plotted and enacted by Venky and Parvathy, both deeply hurt by their partners' deceit, in order to teach their spouses about the pain they themselves went through.

The last shot of the movie shows Ravi and Parvathy a year later at a hospital for the infirm. They see a paralyzed Devi, a victim of a suicide attempt, being cared for by an affectionate Venky.

Cast
 Jayasurya as Venkatesh
 Anoop Menon as Ravi Abraham
 Samvrutha Sunil as Parvathy, Ravi's wife
 Fahadh Faasil as Naveen Krishnamurthy, Ravi's boss
 Aparna Nair as Devi
 Innocent as Kalyan Krishnan
 Mamukoya as Hakkim Seth
 Kani Kusruti as Elsa, the prostitute
 Lena as the doctor
 Joju George as Anand, Ravi's colleague
 Esther Anil as Ravi's daughter
 Janardhan Athri as the singer
Mohanlal as Manu, Ravi's brother in archived footage

Box office
Even though Cocktail could not manage a bumper initial, the movie picked up after a couple of days of the release. It has the dubious distinction of raising a controversy about the box-office performance. In a box-office analysis, Sify said that the film did not do well. However, an article in Expressbuzz.com, published some days after its release, said that the film is a "sleeper hit" and had a "dream run at the box office".

Soundtrack
The soundtrack of the film was composed by Alphons Joseph and Ratheesh Vegha. The album features seven songs written by Anil Panachooran and Santhosh Varma.

References

External links
 

2010 films
2010s Malayalam-language films
2010 crime thriller films
2010s road movies
Indian road movies
Films shot in Kochi
Films shot in Telangana
Films shot in Coimbatore
Indian remakes of British films
Films scored by Alphons Joseph
Films with screenplays by Anoop Menon
2010s mystery thriller films
Malayalam films remade in other languages
2010 directorial debut films
Films directed by Arun Kumar Aravind